Lorenzo Manuel Porfirio Elízaga y Romero Rubio (11 April 1903 – 8 March 1985) was a Mexican bobsledder. He competed in the five-man event at the 1928 Winter Olympics.

References

External links
 

1903 births
1985 deaths
Mexican male bobsledders
Olympic bobsledders of Mexico
Bobsledders at the 1928 Winter Olympics
Sportspeople from Mexico City